Orer, Armenian European Independent Magazine (Armenian: Օրեր Համաեվրոպական անկախ ամսագիր) was established in September 1999 in Prague. The publisher is the Information Centre Caucasus-Eastern Europe international non-governmental organisation with the editor-in-chief Hakob Asatryan. The bimonthly magazine not only covers the life of Armenians living in the Czech Republic, but also the community life, sports, cultural, and political life of Armenians throughout more than 30 European countries of the world as well as ongoing events in Armenia. 

ORER (Armenian: Օրեր - Days) highlights Armenian-European relations & bilateral diplomatic and political ties. Czech-Armenian projects, economic cooperation are widely covered, interviews with Czech famous people, government officials and public figures. Pages are devoted to the art and important cultural events taking place in Armenia & in Europe as well as new books published, Armenian and foreign artists, musicians & writers. Sports articles are released giving information on the accomplishments and achievements of Armenian athletes.

ORER is distributed in 25 countries of Europe; the Czech Republic, Germany,  Poland, Hungary, Slovakia, Italy, Greece, France, Russia, the United Kingdom, Sweden, Switzerland, Spain, Cyprus, the Netherlands, Belgium and others.

See also
 List of magazines in the Czech Republic

External links 
 
 Azad-Hye

1999 establishments in the Czech Republic
Armenian-language magazines
Bi-monthly magazines
Magazines established in 1999
Magazines published in the Czech Republic
Magazines published in Prague
News magazines published in Europe
Armenia–Czech Republic relations